Svitlana Winnikow (14 August 1919 - 28 October 1981, born Swetlana Redtko-Redtschenko) was an engineer in Austria, Australia, and Canada before arriving in America in 1960. She was the first woman professor of Mechanical Engineering-Engineering Mechanics at Michigan Technological University and the area director providing leadership for undergraduate and graduate programs for the energy thermo-fluids research group.

Education 
Winnikow graduated from universities in the former Yugoslavia and Austria before becoming the first woman to earn a PhD in Engineering at the University of Illinois where she was a member of the local Scientific Research Honor Society, Sigma Xi.

Career 
Her engineering experience included working for a consulting bureau in Austria and Department of Public Works in Australia. Winnikow's professional memberships included: Association of Professional Engineers of Alberta, Canada, Engineering Institute of Canada, American Association of University Professors, University of Illinois Alumni Association, and American Society of Mechanical Engineers. 

She became a professor at Michigan Technological University in 1967 teaching fluid mechanics and thermodynamics. Shortly after her death in 1981, Michigan Technological University adopted a Special Tribute for her service and honored her request to apply $150,000 of her personal assets toward funding an endowed fellowship to graduate students studying thermo-fluid mechanics.

Research interests 
Winnikow's early research involved diesel engine design before arriving at Michigan Technological University to lead research efforts on experimental and analytical fluid mechanics.

References 

1918 births
1981 deaths
Michigan Technological University
University of Zagreb alumni
Graz University of Technology alumni
University of Illinois alumni
Michigan Technological University faculty
Women engineers